Kamar Sabz is the name of a mountain and its town in the South Khorasan province of Iran. It has a latitude (DMS) of 31° 58′ 39′′ N and a longitude of 59° 7′ 33′′ E.

Mountain ranges of Iran